The 1973 Segunda División de Chile was the 22nd season of the Segunda División de Chile.

Aviación was the tournament's champion.

Table

See also
Chilean football league system

References

External links
 RSSSF 1973

Segunda División de Chile (1952–1995) seasons
Primera B
Chil